Jayanagar, Nepal may refer to:

 Jayanagar, Kapilvastu, a village of the Kapilvastu district in the Nepal.
 Jayanagar, Rautahat, a village of the Rautahat district in the Nepal.

 Jayanagar Bank Jayanagar gaon